Portsmouth Bombers Football Club is a Dominican football club representing Portsmouth, Dominica (on the northern side of the country, hence their previous name Northern Bombers) but that plays its home games in Roseau, Dominica (on the southwestern side of the country).  The club competes in the Dominica Premiere League, the top tier of Dominica football.

Honours 
Dominica Premiere League: 1
 2013–14

Stadium
Currently the team plays at the 12,000 capacity Windsor Park Cricket Stadium.

References

External links
Soccerway profile

Football clubs in Dominica